The Sri Lanka Navy (SLN) is the naval arm of the Sri Lanka Armed Forces and is classed as the country's most vital defence force due to its island geography and is responsible for the maritime defense of the Sri Lankan nation and its interests. The role of the Sri Lanka Navy is to conduct operations at sea for the defence of the nation and its interests and conduct prompt and sustainable combat operations at sea in accordance with the national policies.

Sri Lanka, situated in the middle of major sea lanes passing through the Indian Ocean, was always a magnet for seafarers and has a long history of naval campaigns. The current Sri Lankan Navy was established on 9 December 1950 when the Navy Act was passed for the formation of the Royal Ceylon Navy. The roots of the modern Sri Lankan Navy date back to 1937 when the Ceylon Naval Volunteer Force was established, which was renamed and absorbed into the Royal Navy as the Ceylon Royal Naval Volunteer Reserve during World War II. The current name Sri Lanka Navy was constituted in 1972 when Sri Lanka became a republic and the introduction of new constitution.

It played a key role in the Sri Lankan Civil War, conducting surveillance and patrol, amphibious and supply operations. During the war, the navy moved from a small force focused on coastal patrols to a large combat force concentrating on asymmetric naval warfare capable of amphibious and land operations in support of counter-insurgency operation that progressed into engagements of a new form of littoral zone warfare. It carried out expeditionary deployments in the Indian Ocean in order to intercept rogue arm shipments on the high seas. The navy has its own elite special forces unit, the Special Boat Squadron.

The professional head of the navy is the Commander of the Navy, currently Vice Admiral Priyantha Perera. The commander-in-chief of the Sri Lanka Armed Forces is the President of Sri Lanka, who heads the National Security Council; the Ministry of Defence is the organization where ship buying policies are made for the navy. The Sri Lanka Navy has five Advanced Offshore Patrol Vessels (equivalent to a traditional patrol frigate), three Offshore Patrol Vessels, two missile boats, 40 fast attack crafts, more than 200 patrol boats, seven landing ships/craft, along with six auxiliary vessels. Its personnel number is 48,000 of whom approximately 15,000 are deployed for shore duties.

History

The Beginning and World War II
In January 1938 the Ceylon Naval Volunteer Force (CNVF) was created with Commander W.G. Beauchamp as Commanding Officer under ordinance No I of 1937. On 31 August 1939 at the out set of World War II, the CNVF was mobilised for war duties. Three years later, the CNVF was offered to, and accepted by the Royal Navy (RN) as a Volunteer Reserve, the Ceylon Royal Naval Volunteer Reserve (CRNVR). It continued under Royal Navy operational and administrative command until March 1946. With the end of the war, it reverted to Ceylon Government control, though yet CRNVR in name. In the 1939–1946 period, the CRNVR carried out several operational duties, mainly at sea. Cutting its teeth on the Port Commission tugs Samson and Goliath, it later manned and operated trawlers and Antarctic whalers converted as minesweepers and fitted out with guns, submarine detection equipment and anti-submarine weaponry. They were HMS Overdale Wyke (the first ship to be purchased by the Government of Ceylon), HMS Okapi, HMS Semla, HMS Sambhur, HMS Hoxa, HMS Balta and HM Tugs Barnet and C 405. In addition the CRNVR manned several Motor Fishing Vessels (MFV), Harbour Defence Motor Launch (HDML) and miscellaneous auxiliary vessels. All were manned exclusively by CRNVR personnel. These ships were meant to sweep and guard the approaches the harbours but were often used on extended missions outside Ceylon waters. In the course of these operations, the ships came under enemy fire, recovered essential information from Imperial Japanese aircraft that were shot down, sailed to Akyab (modern Sittwe) after the Burma front was opened in two FMVs for harbour duties, and were called upon to accept the surrender of the Italian sloop Eritrea and escort her to the Colombo port with a prize crew on board.

Royal Ceylon Navy

Formation 
With Ceylon gaining self rule from the British in 1948, the Parliament of Ceylon passed the Navy Act, No. 34 of 1950 which established the Royal Ceylon Navy (RCyN) on 9 December 1950. The CRNVR served as a source of officers and sailors for the newly established RCyN as one hundred were selected and transferred to the regular naval force. Under the Navy Act, the CRNVR became the  volunteer naval force on 9 January 1951 as the Royal Ceylon Volunteer Naval Force (RCVNF). The first warship of the RCyN was commissioned in 1951 as HMCyS Vijaya, an Algerine-class minesweeper, ex-HMS Flying Fish along with other patrol boats and tugs. It was the policy of His Majesties Government of Ceylon to build a strong navy to be the first line of defence of the island country. As such the fleet was expanded with the addition of, HMCyS Parakrama, another Algerine-class minesweeper (ex-HMS Pickle), two Canadian-built "River" class frigates HMCyS Mahasena (ex-HMCS Orkney, Violetta and ex-Israeli ship Mivtach), HMCyS Gajabahu (ex-HMCS Hallowell, ex-Israeli Misnak) and an oceangoing tug (ex-HMS Adept). The RCyN took part in several joint naval exercises and a goodwill missions. Commodore Royce de Mel became the first Ceylonese to head the navy as he was appointed Captain of the RCyN in 1955. In 1959, the navy took over the strategic Royal Naval Dockyard, Trincomalee as the last of the British forces in Ceylon withdrew. In 1960, flexing its blue water capability a naval fleet undertook a deployment to the far east. Its return resulted in scandal as a search for contraband took place. A Commission of Inquiry into the incident resulted in the dismissal of several officers (with commissions withdrawn and others retired) and the compulsory retirement of Rear Admiral de Mel, who was thereafter implicated in an attempt military coup d'état in 1962.

Stagnation 
In the aftermath of the attempted coup, the armed forces saw major budget cuts that dramatically halted the expansion it enjoyed in the 1950s. Under N. Q. Dias, the Ministry of External Affairs and Defence changed its defense policy taking steps to prevent a further coup attempts. Joint operations among armed services were stopped, with the army to focused on internal security and the role of the navy was scaled down. As a result, several of its ships were sold off and its size reduced by the stoppage of recruitment of officers cadets and sailors for over seven years, the loss of important bases and barracks and the stoppage of training in the United Kingdom. Two batches of 300 ratings were recruited in 1966 and 1969.

Insurrection 

As a result, in 1971 the navy was poorly equipped and short of personnel when the 1971 JVP Insurrection broke out. RCyN had only one warship, HMCyS Gajabahu which was not put to sea as its crew were dispatched with other naval personal for shore duty. RCyN initially mounted the defence of ports and thereafter carryout offensive counter insurgency operations against the insurgents. During the insurrection navy suffered its first combat casualties and went on to man detention centres to rehabilitate surrendered insurgents after it was crushed in a few months. Ceylon, however, had to rely on the Indian Navy to established an exclusion zone around the island.

Navy of the Republic

In 1972 the "Dominion of Ceylon" became the "Democratic Socialist Republic of Sri Lanka" and the Royal Ceylon Navy became the Sri Lanka Navy. The ensign, along with the Flag Officers' flags, were redesigned. The term "Captain of the Navy", introduced in the Navy Act, was changed to "Commander of the Navy", in keeping with the terminology adopted by the other two services. Finally, "Her Majesty's Ceylon Ships" (HMCyS) became "Sri Lankan Naval Ships" (SLNS).

The navy began rebuilding its strength in the 1970s with the gift of Shershen-class torpedo boats from the USSR and acquisition of five Type 062-class gunboats from China to carry out effective coastal patrolling and carried out several cruises to regional ports. New bases were established to counter smuggling operations in the coastal areas. Five inshore patrol crafts were ordered from Cheverton, while six coastal patrol craft were built by the Colombo Dockyards.

Civil war

At the begin of the civil war in the 1980s the navy found itself poorly equipped to face the new threats the LTTE created. It found itself engaging in anti-smuggling operations to counter LTTE gun running between India and Sri Lanka. As the larger gun boats proved ineffective against faster small boats used by the LTTE with outboard motors, the navy began deploying small boats with waterjets and inshore patrol boats armed with machine guns to police its waters. The LTTE responded with mounting machine guns and attacking the navy boats. This began an asymmetric war at sea, taking place primarily in the coastal waters among small boats of the navy and the LTTE naval arm the Sea Tigers. The decades long conflict saw the escalations of the size, fire power and speed of the boats with new techniques deployed by both sides. The Sea tigers mastered the art of using sophisticated suicide crafts against naval vessels both small and large. The navy acquired in the late 1980s Israeli Dvora-class fast patrol boats which it designated as Fast Attack Crafts (FAC). The FACs of the Fast Attack Flotilla became the work horse of the navy's offensive and defensive operations against the Sea tigers. In the 1990s and 2000s Super Dvora class boats were added and a locally built Colombo class was introduced in larger numbers. These proved highly successful in limiting the LTTE's use of the seas.

During the war the navy increased its fleet of larger vessels by introducing two locally built Jayasagara class offshore patrol vessels. The navy lost several ships in the 1990s to sea tiger attacks by suicide crafts such as in the sinking of SLNS Sagarawardena and SLNS Ranaviru and the use of suicide frogmen such as in the bombing of SLNS Sooraya and SLNS Ranasuru. Due to the treat posed by the sea tigers the navy had to undertake convoy duty to escort shipping to the Jaffna peninsula to which all land routes were controlled by the LTTE. In order keep supply lines open to Jaffna, the navy employed several auxiliary ships. It also deployed auxiliary ships to support FACs.

In the early 1980s a land combat force named Naval Patrolmen was created which at first limited itself to base defence and as its numbers increased took part in offensive operations against the LTTE along with the Sri Lankan Army. An elite naval special forces unit called the Special Boat Squadron was created in the late 1980s based on the British Special Boat Service.

In order to support ground operations of the army, landing ships and boats were acquired. In early 1990s the SLN carried out injunction with the army its first amphibious operation code named Operation Sea Breeze followed by the larger Operation Balavegaya a year later and on the seas it began an aggressive clamp down on LTTE actives including gunrunning. In 1992, Admiral W.W.E. Clancy Fernando, the commander of the navy was assassinated by a suicide bomb attack by the LTTE.

The mid-1990s saw a slow expansion of larger fleet assets with addition of newer Type 062-class gun boats and a Haiqing class submarine chaser being added to the fleet to intercept arms shipments destine for the tigers within Sri Lankan territorial waters. In 2000 the Navy started a fleet air arm (FAA) by acquiring a HAL Chetak from India to expand its surveillance capability by operating from newly acquired Offshore Patrol Vessels. During the same time conventional warfare capability was increased by the addition of Sa'ar 4-class missile boats. In 2004, the navy received a Reliance-class cutter from the United States Excess Defense Articles (EDA) program.

Following the resumptions of hostilities between the government of Sri Lanka and the LTTE since early 2006, the navy took up an active role in limiting the LTTE's use of the seas. This resulted in several major sea battles curring the course of 2006, 2007 and 2009. Most significant of the events during this time were the interception and sinking of several large cargo ships that were bringing illegal arms shipments to the LTTE in the Indian Ocean in international waters. These naval operations have proven the blue water capability of the Sri Lankan Navy.

During the war the navy, along with the army developed its own weapons development programmes to produce and maintain weapon systems suited for indigenous requirements in collaboration with Colombo Dockyard which included the Jayasagara class, Colombo class and the Ranavijaya class; while the navy designed and developed the Arrow class.

Post war

With the end of the civil war, the navy has begun reorienting itself for the future defence of the island. This has led to force redeployment, training exercises and transfer of certain duties to the newly formed Sri Lanka Coast Guard. In the post war years the navy has expanded it maritime operations to fisheries control and counter human trafficking. Operations to counter illegal poaching by Tamil Nadu fishermen have led to allegations that personnel from the Sri Lanka Navy have attacked more than twelve fishermen, two of whom have died, in a series of disputes. Australia transferred two Bay-class patrol boats to the Sri Lanka Navy, following its Prime Minister's visit to the island for the Commonwealth Heads of Government Meeting in November 2013. The first of these vessels was delivered in April 2014.

Blue water navy

Expanding its blue water capability the navy began commissioning larger fleet assets equivalent to Patrol frigates, which it termed as Advanced Offshore Patrol Vessels. In April and August 2018 two 105m long vessels of the Saryu-class were commissioned. Built by Goa Shipyard on order to the Sri Lanka navy, these were the largest purpose built ships for the Sri Lanka Navy.

In 2017, SLNS Sayurala took part in Southeast Asian Nations (ASEAN) International Fleet Review 2017 in Thailand. This is the longest foreign tour (21 days) an SLN Ship undertook after the year 1965 with 127 sailors including 18 officers. This followed in 2018 by SLNS Sagara which sailed to Indonesia to attend the Multilateral Naval Exercise “Komodo” and “International Fleet Review” (IFR) 2018, while SLNS Samudura and SLNS Suranimala sailed to India to take part in Milan. The navy participated in Exercise RIMPAC for the first time in 2018, sending a contingent of marines to the international maritime exercise.

In August 2018, the navy took over a Hamilton-class high endurance cutter which was transferred to the Navy from United States under the EDA program. Commissioned in June 2019 as an Advanced Offshore Patrol Vessel, it became the largest combat vessel in the Sri Lankan navy at 3250 tonnes and second former United States cutter in its service.

In June 2019, the navy took over a Type 053H2G frigate which was transferred to the Navy from China. It will be armed with dual Type 79 100 mm naval guns and two Type 76A dual-37 mm anti-aircraft guns to function as an Advanced Offshore Patrol Vessel.

In August 2021, the navy dispatched its Landing Ship, Tank SLNS Shakthi to sail to the Port of Chennai to sealift urgently needed medical grade oxygen needed for the COVID-19 situation in the island. On 26 October 2021, the navy formally took over the second Hamilton-class high endurance cutter transferred from the United States at the USCG Station Seattle under the EDA program. It is due to reach its home port in 2022, following a seven-month refit in Seattle.

In March 2022, the Government of Sri Lanka signed several defense agreements with the Government of India which included the establishment of a Maritime Rescue Coordinating Centre on an Indian grant as well as the acquisition of Dornier 228 maritime reconnaissance aircraft to the Sri Lanka Air Force to operate with naval personal. A 4,000 ton floating dock constructed by Goa Shipyard was also acquired as part of a grant from India, to facilitate repair and maintenance of larger fleet units based at Trincomalee instead of having to depend dry dock facilities in Colombo.

Major combat operations
Apart from continued deployments at sea the navy has played a significant role in supporting all major operations carried out by the Army including several amphibious operations.

Current deployments
As of present, most of the Sri Lankan Navy is deployed for domestic defence with the end of combat operations, while foreign deployments are carried out from time to time.

Domestic
Due to the Sri Lankan Civil War the navy has been on a constant mobilized (including reservist) state since the 1980s (except for a brief period from 2002 to 2005). The majority of the naval units both at sea and ground-based are deployed in the North and Eastern provinces of the country, as well as in other parts of the country. The security of all major ports of the country is the responsibility of the navy, due to terrorist activity.

Foreign
Haiti - Since 2004 navy personnel have been attached to the Sri Lankan contingent of the United Nations Stabilization Mission in Haiti.
Indian Ocean - In 2007 and 2008 the navy carried out anti-arms smuggling operations in international waters in the Indian Ocean, sinking six rogue merchant ships smuggling arms for the LTTE.

Organisation

The professional head of the navy is the Commander of the Navy (C of N) who reports directly to the Minister of Defence. The Commander of the Navy exercises operational and administrative control of the Navy from Naval Headquarters in SLNS Parakrama, Colombo. He is assisted by the Chief of Staff (C of S); who along with Directors General and Directors comprise the Board of Management (BOM) and Board of Directors (BOD) of the Sri Lanka Navy.

Leadership

Board of Management
The following posts make up the Board of Management:
Director General Operations
Director General Health Services
Director General Logistics
Commandant Volunteer Naval Force
Director General Budget & Finance
Director General Personnel
Director General Administration
Director General Electrical and Electronic Engineering
Director General Training
Director General Engineering
Director General Civil Engineering
Director General Services
Naval Assistant to The Commander of The Navy

Commands

The Navy has seven commands known as Naval Area Commands, each under the control of a flag officer for effective command and administrative control. This is in order to efficiently maintain all ships, crafts and vehicles; and to ensure the operational readiness of commands and units each area shall have its own harbour/ base, repair and refitting facilities, signal centres, logistic, civil engineering and medical facilities.

Seven Naval Area Commands (see image to the right)
Northern Naval Area (NNA)
North Central Naval Area (NCNA)
North Western Naval Area (NWNA)
Western Naval Area (WNA)
Southern Naval Area (SNA)
Eastern Naval Area (ENA)
South Eastern Naval Area (SENA)

Units
 3rd Fast Gun Boats Squadron (3 FGS)
 4th Fast Attack Flotilla (4 FAF)
 7th Surveillance Command Squadron
 Special Boat Squadron
 Rapid Action Boat Squadron
 Sri Lanka Marine Corps
Naval Boat Building Yard

Branches

Sri Lanka Navy consists following branches to which personnel are attached to;

Executive Branch
Navigation and Direction
Communications 
Gunnery
Missiles
Anti-Submarine Warfare (ASW)
Diving
Hydrography
Engineering Branch
Medical Branch
Logistics Branch
Electrical & Electronics Engineering Branch
Naval Patrolman Branch
Information Technology Branch
Musical Branch
Legal Branch
Provost Branch

Training

At the formation of the Royal Ceylon Navy in 1950, it looked to the Royal Navy to its training in the formational years. Navel rating training was initiated locally with Royal Navy instructors at Royal Naval Dockyard, Trincomalee while officer cadets and specialist training took place in the United Kingdom. Initial batches of officer cadets were sent to Britannia Royal Naval College, along with specialized training at trade schools of the Royal Navy, while senior officers were sent to the Royal Naval College, Greenwich and to the Royal College of Defence Studies. Following the resuspension of recruitment following the suspension from 1962 to 1967, the Naval and Maritime Academy was established for basic officer training. With the rapid expansion of the Sri Lankan armed forces in the 1980s and 1990s saw the establishment of local specialist and trade schools in the navy, along with staff colleges and a defence university. At present the Director General Training directs all naval training establishments.

All pre-commissioning training for officers are carried out at the Naval and Maritime Academy (NMA) at the SLN Dockyard in Trincomalee and short/specialised officer training is conducted at the SLNS Gemunu, Welisara.  This training includes theoretical aspects covered at the training institute followed by a practical exposure on board the Sri Lanka Navy fleet at sea. The Naval & Maritime Academy also has specialist schools for training areas such as ASW, diving, medicine, combat, NBCD and sniper. It also conducts the Sub Lieutenant Technical Course for newly commissioned officers, the Junior Naval Staff Course for staff officers and the Long Logistics Management Course (LLMC) for logistics officers of the navy. The General Sir John Kotelawala Defence University (KDU) formed in 1981 and situated in Ratmalana, fourteen kilometers south of Colombo, is Sri Lanka's only university specialising in defence studies. Apart from postgraduate defence studies each year, approximately fifty cadets from all three services are admitted to the university (aged 18–22) to participate in a three-year programme of under graduate studies.

Senior officers of the ranks of Lieutenant Commander and Commander follow the Command and Staff Course at the Defence Services Command and Staff College (DSCSC) at Batalanda, Makola which allows officers to gain a Masters Of Science (Defence Studies) degree from the KDU. Senior officers destined for flag rank attend the prestigious National Defence College (NDC) in Colombo which is the highest level of training leading to a  Master of Philosophy from the KDU. The navy continuous to send its senior officers for overseas training.

Basic training for new recruits (approximately six months) are conducted at  Advanced Naval Training Centre, SLNS 'Nipuna'; Naval Institute of Technology, SLNS 'Thakshila', Welisara; and at Naval Recruit Training Centres at several shore establishments. This basic training will be followed by on-the-job training on-board fleet units and at shore establishments. Combat Training School at SLNS 'Pandukabaya' conducts combat training for Naval Patrolmen.

Additional training is carried out in UK, India, Pakistan, Australia.

Main training establishments,
Naval & Maritime Academy - SLN Dockyard
Advanced Naval Training Centre - SLNS Nipuna
Naval Artificer Training Institute - SLNS Thakshila
Naval Recruit Training Centre - SLNS Shiksha
Naval Recruit Training Centre/Combat Training School - SLNS Pandukabaya

Current Fleet

The Sri Lankan Naval fleet consists of above 250 combat, support ships and inshore patrol craft, with most originating from the United States, China, India, Israel. While Naval Boat Building Yard, Colombo Dockyard provide locally.

Ships

Main Naval Weapons Systems
 Gabriel - Anti-ship missile
 Oto Melara 76 mm naval artillery
 PJ33A 100 mm dual gun naval artillery
 Typhoon - Naval Optronic Stabilized Weapon Platforms
 M242 Bushmaster - 25 mm (25x137mm) chain-fed autocannon
Naval variant of a locally developed guided missile and 40-barrel and 20-barrel MRLS to be soon installed on naval vessels

Naval Exercises 
Sri Lanka often conducts and participate naval exercises with other friendly forces and countries designed to increase naval cooperation and also to strengthen cooperative security relationship.

Marine battalion 

In 2016, the Sri Lanka Navy formed its first battalion of Marines specializing in amphibious warfare. The unit started training under the assistance of the 11th Marine Expeditionary Unit of the United States Marine Corps in November 2016 and received further training from the Commando Regiment of Sri Lanka Army.

The first group consisting of 164 Marines, consisting of 6 officers and 158 sailors, passed out on 27 February 2017 from Naval Base SLNS Barana in Mullikulam in a ceremony attended by the President Maithripala Sirisena, and the Commander of the Navy Vice Admiral Ravindra Wijegunaratne alongside the tri-force Commanders and other senior officers. On July 29, 2017, Vice Admiral Wijegunarathna opened the new Marine Headquarters, SLNS Vidura in Sampoor, Trincomalee.

Personnel

Parama Weera Vibhushanaya recipients 
The Parama Weera Vibhushanaya is the highest award for valour awarded in the Sri Lankan armed forces. Navy recipients include;
 Lieutenant Commander Jude Lakmal Wijethunge 
 Chief Petty Officer K. G. Shantha

Notable fallen members
Over 23,790 Sri Lankan armed forces personnel were killed since the start of the civil war in 1981 to its end in 2009, this includes 2 admirals killed in active duty or assassinated. 659 service personnel were killed due to the second JVP insurrection from 1987 to 1990. 53 service personnel were killed and 323 were wounded in the first JVP insurrection from 1971 to 1972. Notable fallen members includes;

 Admiral W.W.E. Clancy Fernando  - Commander of the Navy
 Rear admiral Mohan Jayamaha  - Commander, Northern Naval Area

Women in the Sri Lanka Navy
Women in the Sri Lanka Navy were taken by the help of Women's Royal Naval Service (Britain); however, for women in the Sri Lanka Navy, there is no separate branch or department. Women can join both as officers and sailors.

Today women are recruited to both the regular and volunteer forces. Although at first limited to the medical branch, currently females are able to join any branch of the navy. In 2007, the navy appointed its first-ever female Commodore, Surgeon Commodore Indranee Y. Amarasinghe.

Ranks
The following tables present the military ranks and insignia of the Sri Lanka Navy. These ranks generally correspond with those of Western or Commonwealth Nations militaries, and reflect those of the British warrant officer, non-commissioned officer and enlisted ranks and the Commissioned officer ranks. Sri Lanka does have an Admiral rank, but it is usually only awarded to the Chief of Defence Staff (CDS) or as an honorary rank.

Officers

Other ranks

Future of Sri Lanka Navy
The Sri Lanka Navy set a medium-term fleet expansion goal targeting ten new vessels in its 'Sri Lanka Navy 2025' plan as part of its expansion of blue water operations.

According to the Maritime Doctrine of Sri Lanka (MDSL) published in 2020, the establishment of Naval Aviation consisting of helicopters and drones have been proposed and initial steps have been taken.

Naval variant of a locally developed guided missile and 40-barrel and 20-barrel MRLS to be soon installed on naval vessels.

See also
Military of Sri Lanka
Commander of the Navy
Military ranks and insignia of the Sri Lanka Navy
Fast Attack Flotilla
Special Boat Squadron
Rapid Action Boat Squadron
Naval and Maritime Academy
Hoods Tower Museum
Sri Lankan Civil War

References

External links 

Official website
Ministry of Defence Sri Lanka
General Sir John Kotelawala Defence Academy

 
Defence agencies of Sri Lanka
Military of Sri Lanka